Henri Snoeck was a Belgian wrestler. He competed in the Greco-Roman light heavyweight and the freestyle light heavyweight events at the 1920 Summer Olympics.

References

External links
 

Year of birth missing
Year of death missing
Olympic wrestlers of Belgium
Wrestlers at the 1920 Summer Olympics
Belgian male sport wrestlers
Place of birth missing
20th-century Belgian people